Eldorado is a town in Jackson County, Oklahoma, United States. The population was 446 at the 2010 census.

The Southern Baptist pastor, W. A. Criswell, was born in Eldorado in 1909. He was the long-term pastor of the First Baptist Church of Dallas, Texas.

Geography
Eldorado is located at  (34.472560, -99.649330).

Demographics

As of the census of 2010, there were 446 people living in the town. There were 274 housing units at an average density of 389.9 per square mile (150.9/km2). The racial makeup of the town was 90.70% White, 1.14% Native American, 0.19% Asian, 6.83% from other races, and 1.14% from two or more races. Hispanic or Latino of any race were 8.35% of the population.

There were 234 households, out of which 25.6% had children under the age of 18 living with them, 47.4% were married couples living together, 10.7% had a female householder with no husband present, and 38.0% were non-families. 35.9% of all households were made up of individuals, and 23.9% had someone living alone who was 65 years of age or older. The average household size was 2.25 and the average family size was 2.90.

In the town, the population was spread out, with 23.7% under the age of 18, 9.3% from 18 to 24, 19.4% from 25 to 44, 18.8% from 45 to 64, and 28.8% who were 65 years of age or older. The median age was 43 years. For every 100 females, there were 84.3 males. For every 100 females age 18 and over, there were 87.9 males.

The median income for a household in the town was $21,806, and the median income for a family was $26,354. Males had a median income of $25,000 versus $15,000 for females. The per capita income for the town was $12,003. About 20.3% of families and 23.8% of the population were below the poverty line, including 24.8% of those under age 18 and 25.0% of those age 65 or over.

References

External links
 Encyclopedia of Oklahoma History and Culture - Eldorado

Towns in Jackson County, Oklahoma
Towns in Oklahoma